Miljan Mrdaković (6 May 1982 – 22 May 2020) was a Serbian professional footballer who played as a striker.

A journeyman, he played for 20 clubs across ten countries and scored 150 goals in all competitions. He also represented Serbia at the 2008 Olympics.

Club career
Mrdaković was born in Niš, Socialist Federal Republic of Yugoslavia. After starting out at FK Radnički Niš and FK Partizan he moved to Belgian club R.S.C. Anderlecht at the age of 16, playing for their youth and reserve teams before going on loan to fellow Belgian First Division side S.C. Eendracht Aalst in early 2002.

Subsequently, Mrdaković returned to his homeland and signed with OFK Beograd on a free transfer. He was his team's top scorer in the 2002–03 season and third overall with 20 league goals, and in August 2003 transferred back to Belgium by joining K.A.A. Gent on a four-year contract. He left by mutual agreement in April 2004, then spent a further one and a half years with OFK.

In early 2005, Mrdaković signed with SV Austria Salzburg. Six months later, he left for FC Metalist Kharkiv of the Ukrainian Premier League and, in August 2006, was acquired by Israeli side Maccabi Tel Aviv FC. During his spell at the latter, he scored eight times across all competitions.

After spending the 2007–08 campaign in the Portuguese Primeira Liga with Vitória de Guimarães, Mrdaković plied his trade in the Chinese Super League with Shandong Luneng Taishan FC. In July 2009, he agreed to a two-year deal at Apollon Limassol FC. He failed to make an immediate impact, being loaned to fellow Cypriot First Division club Ethnikos Achna FC the following transfer window.

Mrdaković returned to the Tsirio Stadium for 2010–11, netting a career-best 21 goals to lead all players. In June 2011, he signed with AEK Larnaca FC on a three-year contract. He scored seven times in the league during his tenure, leaving in February 2012.

In early 2012, Mrdaković rejoined the Chinese top flight with Jiangsu Sainty FC. He returned to Cyprus shortly after, joining Enosis Neon Paralimni FC.

After a few months in the Super League Greece with Veria FC, Mrdaković moved to Tampines Rovers FC of Singapore in January 2014 as their marquee player. He scored 25 goals overall, helping his team win two cup titles (Charity Shield in February and League Cup in July).

In February 2015, Mrdaković returned to Greece and signed with Levadiakos FC. He joined FK Vojvodina on a one-year deal in June, scoring twice in the qualifying rounds of the UEFA Europa League as the side progressed to the play-off round.

Mrdaković returned to OFK Beograd on 19 January 2017, stating his intention to retire at the club.

International career
Mrdaković represented FR Yugoslavia at the 2001 UEFA European Under-18 Championship. He was also capped for the national under-21 team, but saw little action due to a conflict with Vladimir Petrović.

In July 2008, Mrdaković was additionally called up by Miroslav Đukić to the Serbia squad for the 2008 Summer Olympics. He was one of the three overage players alongside Aleksandar Živković and Vladimir Stojković. He appeared in all three group stage matches, scoring in the 4–2 loss against Ivory Coast.

Mrdaković received his first call-up to a full Serbia squad in May 2011, when Petrović selected him for two friendlies in Asia and Oceania. However, he missed the mini tour due to an injury picked up in a training session.

Death
Mrdaković died by suicide in the Zvezdara municipality of Belgrade on 22 May 2020, aged 38.

Career statistics

Honours
Shandong Luneng
Chinese Super League: 2008

Tampines Rovers
Singapore League Cup: 2014
Singapore Charity Shield: 2014

Individual
Cypriot First Division top scorer: 2010–11

References

External links

1982 births
2020 deaths
2020 suicides
Sportspeople from Niš
Serbia and Montenegro footballers
Serbian footballers
Association football forwards
First League of Serbia and Montenegro players
Serbian SuperLiga players
Serbian First League players
FK Partizan players
OFK Beograd players
FK Vojvodina players
FK Rad players
Belgian Pro League players
R.S.C. Anderlecht players
S.C. Eendracht Aalst players
K.A.A. Gent players
Austrian Football Bundesliga players
FC Red Bull Salzburg players
Ukrainian Premier League players
FC Metalist Kharkiv players
Israeli Premier League players
Maccabi Tel Aviv F.C. players
Primeira Liga players
Vitória S.C. players
Chinese Super League players
Shandong Taishan F.C. players
Jiangsu F.C. players
Cypriot First Division players
Apollon Limassol FC players
Ethnikos Achna FC players
AEK Larnaca FC players
Enosis Neon Paralimni FC players
Super League Greece players
Football League (Greece) players
Veria F.C. players
Levadiakos F.C. players
Agrotikos Asteras F.C. players
Singapore Premier League players
Tampines Rovers FC players
Serbia and Montenegro under-21 international footballers
Olympic footballers of Serbia
Footballers at the 2008 Summer Olympics
Serbia and Montenegro expatriate footballers
Serbian expatriate footballers
Expatriate footballers in Belgium
Expatriate footballers in Austria
Expatriate footballers in Ukraine
Expatriate footballers in Israel
Expatriate footballers in Portugal
Expatriate footballers in China
Expatriate footballers in Cyprus
Expatriate footballers in Greece
Expatriate footballers in Singapore
Serbia and Montenegro expatriate sportspeople in Belgium
Serbia and Montenegro expatriate sportspeople in Austria
Serbia and Montenegro expatriate sportspeople in Ukraine
Serbian expatriate sportspeople in Israel
Serbian expatriate sportspeople in Portugal
Serbian expatriate sportspeople in China
Serbian expatriate sportspeople in Cyprus
Serbian expatriate sportspeople in Greece
Serbian expatriate sportspeople in Singapore
Suicides in Serbia